Mark Hopley (born  in Crewe, England) was a rugby union player for Northampton Saints in the Guinness Premiership. He played as a flanker and started his playing career at Whitchurch Rugby Club in Shropshire. Like his fellow Northampton team mate Ben Foden, he was educated at Bishop Heber High School in Malpas, Cheshire.

He made his debut for Northampton Saints in 2005 against Newcastle Falcons but really started to shine in the 2007/8 season where he dominated the number 8 shirt. He made 21 appearances and scored 3 tries.

He is now the Saints Academy coach, working alongside the other coaches in developing local talent.

References

External links
Guinness Premiership profile
Northampton Saints Profile
Whitchurch Rugby Club
 

1984 births
Living people
English rugby union players
Northampton Saints players
Birmingham & Solihull R.F.C. players
Rugby union players from Crewe